Córdoba is a municipality in the eastern part of the department of Quindío, Colombia.  It is located 24 km southeast of the departmental capital Armenia. 

Córdoba is bounded to the north by the municipality of Calarcá, to the south by Pijao, to the west by Buenavista, and to the east by the department of Tolima.

Córdoba was founded in 1927 by Jesús García and Jesús Buitrago, and became a municipality in 1966 when it split from Calarcá.  In 2005 it had an estimated population of 7,800, of which 4,100 live in the main urban zone.  By population it is the second smallest municipality in Quindío, after Buenavista.

Córdoba is home to the National Bamboo and Guadua Investigation Center.  Open to the public, the center shows the potential uses of guadua as a material for construction, furniture and decoration.  It undertakes research on the cultivation of new varieties of guadua.

The Bamboo and Guadua Festival (Spanish: Fiesta del Bambú y la Guadua) is held in Córdoba in June.

Municipalities of Quindío Department